Langnau i.E. railway station, also known as Langnau im Emmental railway station,  is a railway station in the municipality of Langnau im Emmental, in the Swiss canton of Bern. It is located at the junction of the standard gauge Bern–Lucerne line of Swiss Federal Railways and the Solothurn–Langnau line of BLS AG.

Services 
The following services stop at Langnau:

 Bern S-Bahn:
 Lucerne S-Bahn:

References

External links 
 
 

Railway stations in the canton of Bern
Swiss Federal Railways stations